Television in Lithuania was introduced in 1957. The following is a list of television channels broadcast in Lithuania.

Main channels

Regional channels

Others

Former channels

See also
 Media of Lithuania
 Lists of television channels

References

 
Television